Jacques Faitlovitch (1881–1955), an Ashkenazi Jew born in Łódź, Congress Poland, studied Ethiopian languages at the Sorbonne under Joseph Halévy. He travelled to Ethiopia for the first time in 1904, with support from the French banker, Baron Edmond de Rothschild.

He travelled and lived among the Ethiopian Jews, and became a champion of their cause. In 1923 he opened a Jewish school in Addis Ababa.

A Zionist, he settled in Tel Aviv in the 1930s and had links with Yitzhak Ben Zvi and with the revisionist movement. Dr. Faitlovitch bequeathed his valuable library to the Tel Aviv Municipality, with the collection now located at the Sourasky Library of the Tel Aviv University.

A film about Faitlovitch's life was planned by Six Point Films. A film entitled Jacques Faitlovitch and the Lost Tribes, directed by French filmmakers, Maurice and Sarah Dorès, was screened in 2012 and later in various film festivals.

References

Sources
 Return of a Lost Tribe 
 
 Photos and letters of Dr. Faitlovitch appear in the Koren Ethiopian Haggada: The Journey to Freedom (page 72-73)

External links
 
 Works by or about Jacques Faitlovitch in University Library JCS Frankfurt am Main: Digital Collections Judaica

1881 births
1955 deaths
Scientists from Łódź
French anthropologists
Linguists from France
Polish emigrants to Mandatory Palestine
University of Paris alumni
Israeli anthropologists
 
Beta Israel
Jewish Ethiopian history
Jewish anthropologists
Congress Poland expatriates in France
Burials at Nahalat Yitzhak Cemetery
20th-century anthropologists
20th-century linguists
Polish expatriates in Ethiopia